Reine Gianoli (13 March 1915 – 21 February 1979) was a French classical pianist.

Biography 
Born in Paris, Gianoli studied with Lazare Lévy, Alfred Cortot, Yves Nat and Edwin Fischer.

Throughout her career, she performed with the greatest orchestras and conductors, including Paul Paray, Felix Weingartner, Hermann Scherchen, Louis Auriacombe, Milan Horvat and Georges Sebastian. She played numerous times in the Strasbourg and Lucerne Festival musical seasons, sharing the stage with Pablo Casals, Pierre Fournier, Georges Enesco and Edwin Fischer.

In 1947, she was appointed piano teacher at the École Normale de Musique de Paris, then in 1977 at the Conservatoire de Paris. There she trained many musicians, such as André Boucourechliev, Maud Garbarini, Géry Moutier, Catherine Joly and Jean-Yves Thibaudet.

Gianoli died in Paris on 21 February 1979 at age 63.

Recordings 
Gianoli made numerous recordings for the Westminster, BAM and Ades firms. Between 1947 and 1955, she recorded Mozart's 17 piano sonatas live.

Worth mentioning is also her recording of the complete trios of Haydn and especially her complete piano works of Schumann, which reflects both the richness of her culture and the freshness of her inspiration.

Legacy
 A short film was dedicated to her by Marcel Bluwal and Claude Ventura. Duration: 13 min, year of production: 1967.

References

External links 
 Reine Gianoli (Piano) on Bach Cantatas Website
 Reine Gianoli's discography on Discogs
 Reine Gianoli, Mozart: Piano Sonatas (Complete) on AllMusic
 Reine Gianoli - Schumann 6 Intermezzi Op. 4 (YouTube)

1915 births
1979 deaths
Musicians from Paris
20th-century French women classical pianists
Academic staff of the Conservatoire de Paris
Academic staff of the École Normale de Musique de Paris
Women music educators